Marie Island is an island  long, which lies immediately north of Cape Evensen on the northwest coast of Stresher Peninsula in Graham Land, Antarctica. The name "Pointe Marie," after the elder sister of Dr. Jean-Baptiste Charcot, was applied by the Third French Antarctic Expedition (1903–05) to a point on the coast close north of Cape Evensen. After the Fourth French Antarctic Expedition (1908–10) Charcot re-applied the name to the southern tip of an island, "Ile Waldeck-Rousseau," in approximately the same latitude. Correlating its survey with those of Charcot, the British Graham Land Expedition (1934–37) identified "Ile Waldeck-Rousseau" as Waldeck-Rousseau Peak on the mainland. The most prominent feature near the peak requiring a name is this island, and the name "Marie Island" preserves Charcot's naming in the locality.

See also 
 List of Antarctic and sub-Antarctic islands

References

Islands of Graham Land
Graham Coast